Hirudinellidae is a family of flatworms belonging to the order Plagiorchiida.

Genera:
 Botula
 Botulus Guiart, 1938
 Hirudinella de Blainville, 1828
 Lampritrema Yamaguti, 1940

References

Platyhelminthes